The Charlotte 49ers baseball team, commonly referred to as Charlotte, represents the University of North Carolina at Charlotte in NCAA Division I college baseball. Established in 1979, the team is a member of the Conference USA. The team plays its home games at Robert & Mariam Hayes Stadium in Charlotte, North Carolina, and are currently coached by Robert Woodard.

Venues 

The 49ers play most home games at Robert & Mariam Hayes Stadium since its completion in 2007. However, the surface where the stadium sits today has been the playing surface dating back to 1984.

Coaches

Major League Baseball
Charlotte has had 46 Major League Baseball Draft selections since the draft began in 1965.

See also
List of NCAA Division I baseball programs

References

External links
 

 
Baseball teams established in 1979
1979 establishments in North Carolina